Piang Luang is a tambon (subdistrict) of Wiang Haeng District, in Chiang Mai Province, Thailand. In 2005 it had a population of 16,757 people. The tambon contains nine villages. The town lies near the border with Shan State, Burma. During the 1960s to the 1980s, it was the headquarter of the Shan United Revolutionary Army.

References

Tambon of Chiang Mai province
Myanmar–Thailand border crossings
Populated places in Chiang Mai province